Club Deportivo Tineo is a Spanish football club based in Tineo, in the autonomous community of Asturias.

History
Founded in 1965, CD Tineo played its entire history in the Regional divisions until it was promoted for the first time to the Tercera División in May 2015.

Season to season

2 seasons in Tercera División

References

External links
Official website 

Football clubs in Asturias
Association football clubs established in 1965
1965 establishments in Spain